The Whakapapa River in New Zealand forms from streams which trickle off the Whakapapa skifield of Mount Ruapehu and down the western slopes of the mountain.

Before construction of the North Island Main Trunk Railway began in about 1904, most of the valley was a dense podocarp forest. In 1914 logging of the last sizeable west bank section of that bush began, near Oio.

Peter McIntyre had a home near Kakahi overlooking the confluence of the Whanganui and Whakapapa rivers, and painted several oil landscapes of the Whakapapa River. After his death, the Whakapapa River undermined the white pumice cliffs where his house was built and claimed the house as its own.

Occasionally people kayak a  stretch of the river from near Ōwhango to near Kakahi. When the river was high enough, kayaks went  from the Whakapapa Intake to Ōwhango bridge. However, Intake Road was closed when a Landcorp farm passed to Te Kotahitanga a Ngāti Tūwharetoa on 1 July 2019. Herenga ā Nuku and Fish and Game have since been negotiating for public access.

Eels and Crans bullies live in the river. Trout were put in the river around 1911 and Fish & Game now describe it as very clear and having one of the finest trout fisheries, with rainbow and brown trout.

Since then the water has been warmer, as about 80% of the river's headwaters now flow into the Waikato catchment. It has also increased the proportion of water coming from developed land. The river is among the worst 25% of rivers for dissolved reactive phosphorus pollution. The Intake was also repaired in 2009.

Tributaries

The river starts where the Whakapapaiti  and Whakapapanui Streams meet. They both run from Ruapehu and are joined by several other streams. They have had several lahars run down them in the last 10,000 years, including 1969 and 1975.

References

External links

 Kayaking on the river

Rivers of Manawatū-Whanganui
Rivers of New Zealand